Teodorico "Boyet" Fernandez III is a Filipino former professional basketball player and the former head coach of the San Beda Red Lions in the National Collegiate Athletic Association (Philippines) (NCAA).

Playing career

Fernandez first broke into public consciousness as a member of the highly touted 1991 Southeast Asian Games gold medal-winning team, where he was back-up to Johnny Abarrientos. Prior to that, he was part of the National Team that finished seventh in the Asian Basketball Confederation (ABC), forerunner of FIBA-Asia. He played college ball for Colegio San Agustin-Bacolod.

He is known for his years as a player with the Sta. Lucia Realtors, Alaska Milkmen, Pop Cola 800s, and the Purefoods TJ Hotdogs. He was once considered by national coach Ron Jacobs as the best back up point guard in the PBA. He was also named into the 2002 Philippine National Training Pool and was listed as a reserve player.

Coaching career

Fernandez's first coaching stint was as an assistant to Alfrancis Chua with the Sta. Lucia Realtors, a position he took on shortly after his retirement in 2004. He succeeded Chua as head coach prior to the 2007 PBA Fiesta Conference. The following year, he guided the franchise to its first-ever and only PBA All-Filipino title, winning the 2007-08 PBA Philippine Cup. For this, he was named PBA Coach of the Year.

He was the last head coach of the Realtors before the team disbanded in 2010.

He also took over the coaching reins of UP Fighting Maroons in the UAAP midway through the 2010 season.

When NLEX Road Warriors joined the PBA D-League in 2011, he took the coaching job and guided the team to six championships in seven conferences.

He was recently the coach for the San Beda Red Lions, a position he took from Ronnie Magsanoc in 2013. He guided the Red Lions to two NCAA Championships.

After NLEX purchased the Air21 franchise in the PBA in 2014, he was tapped as the head tactician for the Road Warriors starting the 2014-15 PBA season.

Coaching record

Professional record

Collegiate record

References

1971 births
Living people
Alaska Aces (PBA) players
Filipino men's basketball coaches
Filipino men's basketball players
Sta. Lucia Realtors coaches
Magnolia Hotshots players
Basketball players from Negros Occidental
Sta. Lucia Realtors players
Pop Cola Panthers players
Pop Cola Panthers draft picks
UP Fighting Maroons basketball coaches
NLEX Road Warriors coaches
San Beda Red Lions basketball coaches